Donato Barcaglia (Pavia, December 1, 1849 – Rome, 1930) was an Italian sculptor.

Biography
He attended the courses of sculpture taught by Abbondio Sangiorgio at the Brera Academy in Milan. His first work at 17 years of age, was Il Vendemmiatore.  Barcaglia established himself as a portraitist in the 1860s before devoting his energies in the following decade to genre sculpture, for which he achieved distinction at the international exhibitions held in Vienna in 1873 and Philadelphia in 1876. This later gave way to a more rigorous classical style both in public works and in the groups sculpted in the first two decades of the new century for tombs in the Cimitero Monumentale in Milan.

Among his works are:
The First Visit
The Butterfly
The Hunter
Soap Bubble
Love Blinded, won Gold medal at Florentine Exhibition, sold  for $68,500 in 1999 and for $167,300 in 2004.
La Vergognosa, (Museum of Trieste)
La Vita che lenta trattenere il Tempo, won a prize in 1876 Exhibition in Philadelphia, then London, Trieste, and Milan in 1881. 
The awakening of the senses, Peri e Cacicco, inspired by Guarany del Gomes 
Lo Spazzacamino

References
 Laura Casone, Donato Barcaglia, online catalogue Artgate by Fondazione Cariplo, 2010, CC BY-SA (source for the first revision of this article).

Other projects

Artists from Pavia
Brera Academy alumni
1849 births
1930 deaths
20th-century Italian sculptors
20th-century Italian male artists
19th-century Italian sculptors
Italian male sculptors
19th-century Italian male artists